Giorgio Sisgoreo (or Sisgoritus; ca. 1445–1509) was a Latinist poet from Venetian Dalmatia.

He was the first humanist from Šibenik and the central personality of Šibenik's humanist circle and also one of the most important figures in 15th-century cultural life of the Croatian people.

His Elegiarum et carminum libri tres ("Book of elegies and poems", Venice, 1477) is considered the first published book by a Croatian poet. American historian J. V. A. Fine emphasizes that Šižgorić and Vinko Pribojević did not consider themselves to be Croats, but rather Slavic-speaking Venetians.

References

Further reading

 Dukić, Davor: Latinska književnost hrvatskog humanizma, Katedra za stariju hrvatsku književnost Odsjeka za kroatistiku Filozofskog fakulteta u Zagrebu, 2007./2008.
 Leksikon hrvatskih pisaca (ed. D. Fališevac, K. Nemec, D. Novaković), Zagreb 2000.

1440s births
1509 deaths
15th-century Croatian poets
Croatian Renaissance humanists
History of Šibenik
Republic of Venice poets
Venetian Slavs
Croatian male poets
Croatian humanists
Italian male poets
Italian humanists